Murrough may refer to:

Murrough Boyle, 1st Viscount Blesington (1645–1718), Irish peer and member of the House of Lords
Murrough mac Toirdelbach Ó Briain, Chief of the Name, the Clan Tiege of Aran, fl. 1575 – 1588
Domhnall Spainneach Mac Murrough Caomhanach (died 1632), the last King of Leinster
Murrough Ua Cellaigh, 41st King of Uí Maine and 8th Chief of the Name, died 1186
Murrough na dTuadh Ó Flaithbheartaigh, Chief of Iar Connacht, died 1593
Murrough McDermot O'Brien, 3rd Baron Inchiquin (1550–1573), the 3rd Baron Inchiquin
Murrough O'Brien, 1st Earl of Inchiquin and 6th Baron Inchiquin (1614–1674), known as Murchadh na dTóiteán ("of the conflagrations")
Murrough O'Brien, 4th Baron Inchiquin (1562–1597), the 4th Baron Inchiquin
Murrough Ó Laoí (1668–1684), Irish physician
Dermot Mac Murrough (1110–1171), King of Leinster in Ireland
Teige Mac Murrough O'Brien (–1577), a son of Murrough O'Brien, 1st Earl of Thomond and Eleanor fitz John
Murrough O'Brien, 1st Earl of Thomond (died 1551), the last King of Thomond, and a descendant of the High King of Ireland, Brian Boru
Murrough O'Brien, 1st Marquess of Thomond KP, PC (Ire) (1726–1808), 5th Earl of Inchiquin, an Irish peer, soldier and politician
Murrough John Wilson KBE (1875–1946), British Army officer, member of parliament, and railway executive

See also
MacMurrough
Murro
Murru